Michael Christopher de Brenni (born 8 February 1978) is an Australian politician currently serving as the Minister for Energy, Renewables and Hydrogen and Minister for Public Works and Procurement of Queensland. He previously served as the Minister for Housing and Public Works, Minister for Sport and Minister for Digital Technology. He has been the Labor member for Springwood in the Queensland Legislative Assembly since 2015.

He served as the Chief Government Whip from the 19 February 2015 to 8 December 2015.

See also
First Palaszczuk Ministry
Second Palaszczuk Ministry
Third Palaszczuk Ministry

References

1978 births
Living people
Members of the Queensland Legislative Assembly
Australian Labor Party members of the Parliament of Queensland
Labor Left politicians
Australian trade unionists
Griffith University alumni
21st-century Australian politicians
20th-century Australian people